Giuseppe Palica (8 October 1869 – 16 December 1936) was an Italian Archbishop.

Born in Rome, he was ordained priest on 18 December 1892.

On 25 April 1917, he was appointed vice-gerent of Rome and titular archbishop of Philippi.

On 20 May 1917, he was ordained bishop by Cardinal Basilio Pompili, vicar general of Rome and its district.

He was present at the signing of the Reichskonkordat between the Holy See and the Nazi government of Germany on 20 July 1933.

He died in Rome, aged 67.

External links
 Catholic Hierarchy

1869 births
1936 deaths
20th-century Italian Roman Catholic titular archbishops
Clergy from Rome